Wakefield Highland is a snow-covered highland in the central region of the Antarctic Peninsula, bounded to the north by Hermes Glacier and the heads of Weyerhaeuser Glacier and Aphrodite Glacier, to the west by the heads of Airy Glacier, Rotz Glacier and Seller Glacier, to the south by Fleming Glacier and to the east by the heads of Lurabee Glacier, Sunfix Glacier and Grimley Glacier.
 
It was photographed from the air by Ronne Antarctic Research Expedition (RARE) on December 22, 1947, and surveyed by Falkland Islands Dependencies Survey (FIDS) in November 1960.
 
The area is named after Viscount Wakefield of Hythe, a contributor to British Graham Land Expedition (BGLE), 1934–37. This toponym, concurred in by United Kingdom Antarctic Place-Names Committee (UK-APC) and Advisory Committee on Antarctic Names (US-ACAN), restores the name Wakefield in the vicinity of the BGLE's displaced "Mount Wakefield" (now Mount Hope).

Plateaus of Antarctica
Landforms of Palmer Land